Jennifer Ann Sinor is an American author and literary nonfiction writer and professor. She primarily writes memoir, research-based creative nonfiction, and personal essays that experiment with non-linear forms. Sinor's work focuses on the body, the ineffable, and the ordinary in our lives. It is often non-linear in form and relies on association, juxtaposition, and speculative leaps.

Biography 

Born in Kingsville, Texas, Sinor was raised as a military dependent. Her father, a naval lawyer specializing in international ocean law, was stationed in Hawaii several times as well as the Pentagon. 

Sinor graduated from the University of Nebraska, Lincoln, in 1987 with degrees in both English and Russian. While teaching 7th and 8th graders at ASSETS school in Honolulu, Hawaii, Jennifer completed her MA in English from the University of Hawaii at Manoa. 
In 1995, she began her PhD in English and Education at the University of Michigan where she focused on women's autobiographical writing. She graduated in 2000 and moved to Logan, Utah. Since then, Sinor has taught in the English Department at Utah State University where she is the chair of the creative writing emphasis and a professor of English.

Writing career 

Sinor has published essays in many journals and anthologies including The American Scholar, The Utne Reader, Creative Nonfiction, The Chronicle of Higher Education, Fourth Genre, The Colorado Review and Seneca Review. Her essay, "Confluences," appears in the 13th edition of the Norton Reader. Her essays have been nominated for the Pushcart Prize and a National Magazine Award.

Awards and nominations 
 Finalist for the Modern Language Association's First Book Prize, 2002, The Extraordinary Work of Ordinary Writing: Annie Ray's Diary
 Nomination for Pushcart Prize, 2007, 2012, 2013, 2016
 Honorable Mention, Personal Essay, Utah Writing Competition, 2007, "Headwaters"
 Nomination for National Magazine Award, 2008, "Confluences," in The American Scholar 
 First place, Utah Original Writing Competition, Book-length Nonfiction, 2009, Rogue Wave 
 First place, Utah Original Writing Competition, Novel, 2010 How Thin the Line

Selected works

Books 
 The Extraordinary Work of Ordinary Writing: Annie Ray's Diary (University of Iowa Press, 2002) 
 Placing the Academy: Essays on the Landscape, Work and Identity. Co-editor with Rona Kaufman (University of Iowa Press, 2007) 
 Letters Like the Day: On Reading Georgia O'Keeffe (University of New Mexico Press, 2017) 
 Ordinary Trauma: A Memoir (University of Utah Press, 2017)

Essays
 “The Marlin,” Fourth Genre, Fall 2004
 "The Marlin," Fourth Genre, Fall 2004
 “Running Through the Dark,” Creative Nonfiction 27, Summer 2008
 "Running Through the Dark," Creative Nonfiction 27, Summer 2008
 “Confluences,” The American Scholar, Winter 2008
 "Confluences," The American Scholar, Winter 2008
 “Creating Voice,” The Rose Metal Press Field Guide to Writing Flash Nonfiction, 2012
 "Creating Voice," The Rose Metal Press Field Guide to Writing Flash Nonfiction, 2012
 “Out in the West,” The American Scholar, Autumn 2011
 "Out in the West," The American Scholar, Autumn 2011
 “The Wanting Creature,” Creative Nonfiction, Winter 2017, Issue #62

References 

American women non-fiction writers
Utah State University faculty
University of Nebraska–Lincoln alumni
University of Hawaiʻi at Mānoa alumni
University of Michigan alumni
American women academics
Year of birth missing (living people)
Living people